Giuseppe Matteo Alberti (or Giuseppi) (20 September 1685, in Bologna, Italy – 18 February 1751, in Bologna, Italy)  was an Italian Baroque composer and violinist.

Life
In 1705, he became a member of the Accademia Filarmonica. From 1709, he played the violin in the orchestra of the San Petronio Basilica in Bologna. Later, he was elected a president of the Accademia Filarmonica six times, the first time in 1721. In 1726, he became maestro di capella of San Giovanni in Monte and in 1734 of San Domenico.

Works
His works were influenced by Antonio Vivaldi and they were much played in England. He wrote mostly instrumental works and published 12 symphonies as well as 10 concertos in six parts for violins.

List of selected works
10 Concerti per chiesa e per camera, Op. 1 (Bologna, 1713)
Oratorio La vergine annunziata (Bologna, 1720)
Sonate a violino e basso, Op. 2 (Bologna, 1721)
XII sinfonie a quattro ‘op.2’ (Amsterdam, 1725)

References

External links

Musicians from Bologna
Italian male classical composers
Italian Baroque composers
Italian classical violinists
Male classical violinists
1685 births
1751 deaths
18th-century Italian composers
18th-century Italian male musicians